Nava Bharat (Translation: New India) is a Hindi-language daily newspaper published through 14 editions from the states of Maharashtra, Madhya Pradesh & Chhattisgarh.  Founded in 1934 Navabharat has the sixth highest readership according to Indian Readership Survey'09 R1 in India amongst Hindi newspapers. With its sister newspapers Central Chronicle and Navarashtra published in English and Marathi respectively. Navabharat has three supplements mainly, Suruchi, Glamour, Awakash.

History

Nava Bharat was launched on 8 February 1934 by Shri Ramgopal Maheshwari (1911–1999), a Gandhian freedom fighter, journalist, and promoter of Hindi language. Maheshwari served as its Editor-in-Chief for 65 years.  It started as a bi-weekly publication in Nagpur, and soon became a daily newspaper; Navabharat has set its boundaries to different parts of the country. The bi-weekly since its inception have participated in the freedom movement and bore the brunt of the British Government. In 1942 during ‘Quit India Movement’ Navabharat risked its existence for its extensive coverage. During this period, the police and secret services kept a close watch on its activities, raided the press and also imprisoned the founder.

Navabharat commemorated the launch of its Jabalpur edition in the year 1950. In the mid nineteenth century, Navabharat launched its Bhopal, Raipur and Indore editions. The 1980s and 1990s saw the launch of a Bilaspur edition in Chhattisgarh, of a Gwalior edition in Madhya Pradesh, and of Pune, Satara and Mumbai editions in Maharashtra.

Navarashtra
Navabharat added another majorly spoken language in their bout with their Marathi daily ‘Navarashtra’ in the year 2000 from the central India. Navarashtra now gets published from three centers Nagpur, Mumbai and Pune along with many other rural areas. Navarashtra has 9 hyper local editions as well and 3 supplements Gunjan, Mayuri and Kshitij.

Central Chronicle
The English daily of Navabharat Media group known as Central Chronicle was started from Bhopal in 1957. Central Chronicle started expanding in the post-independence era. In 1984, the Central Chronicle'''s Bilaspur and Raipur editions were launched. 

Digital Presence
Navabharat entered the digital world so that the news reaches their readers on time with their convenience. They started publishing E-Papers for Navabharat and Navarashtra as substitutes for the print copy. Navabharat and Navarashtra also have their separate Web Portal. They also have three applications namely Navabharat Shorts, Navabharat App and Navarashtra App which are available for both the iOS & Android devices. Navabharat and Navarashtra are available on the social media platforms like Facebook, Twitter, Instagram, Pinterest and YouTube.

Social Initiatives
An organisation must never ignore its responsibilities towards society and should take necessary steps for the benefit of society. Like many other newspapers Navabharat, has also undertaken some responsibilities and social initiatives to create awareness in the society. Latur earthquake caused the firm to organize a relief camp in order to provide food and shelter to the victims of the disaster. Also in the year 1991 when the Mowad flood in Nagpur district, affected thousands of lives, as a part of social responsibility, the organization allied funds and contributed to the affected to rebuild their houses and start all over again. Navabharat to create awareness in the society conducted health checkup camps free of cost for every class of the society. Navabharat also conducted zero load shedding where they helped to solve the load shedding issues which were faced by the people of Nagpur. Many other initiatives and campaigns were conducted by the organization such as the ‘No Parking Board’, Healthy Mornings, Wall graffiti, Zero Mile Campaign, and Swachh Nagpur Sundar Nagpur have turned out to be great examples of social responsibility and awareness among the society.

Community Networks
Navabharat provides a platform to the communities to come together and connect. This has resulted in the genesis of Suruchi, Gurukul, Second Innings, Gen Nex & Udaan. Community networks help people to come together.

EditionsNavaBharat'' is published from the following places:

References

External links 
 Nava Bharat News Portal 
 Nava Bharat website

Hindi-language newspapers
Newspapers published in Maharashtra
Publications established in 1934
Mass media in Madhya Pradesh
Daily newspapers published in India
Mass media in Chhattisgarh
Mass media in Nagpur
Mass media in Indore
Mass media in Ujjain
Newspapers published in Mumbai
1934 establishments in India